Johan Burlin (born April 25, 1989 in Skellefteå) is a Swedish former professional ice hockey player.

Career 
Burlin progressed through the youth hockey system maintained by Skellefteå AIK, including playing 31 games with their Elitserien club during the 2008-09 season.  On 14 May 2009 left Skellefteå AIK and signed with Borås HC of the HockeyAllsvenskan.  He played 12 games with the club before moving to Piteå HC in Division 1, the tier 3 league in Sweden, to complete the season.  During the 2010-11 season, Burlin played the majority of the season with Molot-Prikamye Perm a Russian team competing in the VHL. In 2011-12, Burlin returned to Sweden to play for IF Sundsvall Hockey, which was then competing in HockeyAllsvenskan.  Burlin was on the move once more for the 2012-13 season, when he played for Lausitzer Füchse in 2nd Bundesliga, the German Tier 2 league.  In 2013-14, he played for HC Fassa in Serie A, the top tier league in Italy.  In the 2014 off-season, Burlin signed for KH Sanok in the PHL but was later released from the team without playing a single game. He was signed shortly after by Manchester Phoenix, 2014 champions of the EPIHL for the 2014-15 season.

References

External links

1989 births
Living people
Borås HC players
Étoile Noire de Strasbourg players
SHC Fassa players
Lausitzer Füchse players
LHC Les Lions players
Manchester Phoenix players
Molot-Prikamye Perm players
People from Skellefteå Municipality
Piteå HC players
Skellefteå AIK players
SønderjyskE Ishockey players
IF Sundsvall Hockey players
Swedish ice hockey defencemen
Sportspeople from Västerbotten County